is a song by Japanese pop singer Sayuri. It was released as the fourth single of her debut studio album, Mikazuki no Koukai, on December 7, 2016. It was written and produced by Radwimps's vocalist and guitarist, Yojiro Noda. About the song, Yojiro said, "I had already composed the song and created the lyrics, but I knew that I couldn't sing it. For a while, I searched for the true owner of the song. Then, by chance, I was in the recording studio next to Sayuri. I listened to her CD, and in that moment, something that was only a vague silhouette of a song became crystal clear. It was a song that she was meant to sing."

Music video
The music video for "Furaregai Girl" was directed by Nao Yoshigai. The video features Makoto Tanaka as a girl who has just been dumped depressed with the reality and Sayuri singing in the black background.

Track listing

Regular edition

Limited edition type A

Limited edition type B

Charts

Release history

References

Sayuri (musician) songs
2016 singles
Songs written by Yojiro Noda
2016 songs